The  was a carrier air group (later converted to airbase garrison unit) of the Imperial Japanese Navy (IJN) during the Pacific campaign of World War II.

Structure
Higher unit
4th Carrier Division (1 May 1944–14 November 1944)
2nd Air Fleet (15 November 1944–7 January 1945)
1st Air Fleet (8 January 1945–24 May 1945)
5th Air Fleet (25 May 1945–2 August 1945)
32nd Air Flotilla (3 August 1945–postwar)
Lower unit
163rd Fighter Squadron (1 August 1944–14 November 1944)
167th Fighter Squadron (15 August 1944–14 November 1944)
301st Reconnaissance Squadron (1 January 1945–postwar)
302nd Reconnaissance Squadron (1 July 1945–postwar)
Commanding officers
Cdr. / Capt. Amagai Takehisa (51) - 1 May 1944 - 15 November 1944 (Captain on 15 October 1944.)
Cdr. Emura Nichio (57) - 15 November 1944 - 3 July 1945
Capt. Katsumi Korokuro (51) - 3 July 1945 - 15 September 1945

Bibliography
The Japanese Modern Historical Manuscripts Association, Organizations, structures and personnel affairs of the Imperial Japanese Army & Navy, University of Tokyo Press, Tōkyō, Japan, 1971, .
Bunrin-Dō Co., Ltd., Tōkyō, Japan.
Famous airplanes of the world No. 47, Imperial Japanese Navy Reconnaissance Seaplane, 1994.
Famous airplanes of the world No. 69, Navy Carrier Dive-Bomber "Suisei", 1998, .
Koku-Fan Illustrated No. 42, Japanese Imperial Army & Navy Aircraft Color, Markig, 1988.
Model Art, Model Art Co. Ltd., Tōkyō, Japan.
No. 439, Special issue Heroes of the Imperial Japanese Navy Air Force in 1937–1945, 1994.
No. 510, Special issue Camouflage & Markings of the I.J.N. Fighters, 1998.
No. 565, Special issue Imperial Japanese Navy Seaplanes, 2000.
Japan Center for Asian Historical Records (http://www.jacar.go.jp/english/index.html), National Archives of Japan, Tōkyō, Japan.
Reference Code: C08051771200, Transition table of formation of Imperial Japan Navy Air Units (special establishment) during Pacific War, Japan Demobilization Agency, 1949.

Groups of the Imperial Japanese Navy Air Service
Military units and formations established in 1944